Underworld is the fourth studio album by Japanese rock band Vamps, released on April 26, 2017 in Japan and April 28 internationally. The production took place in Henderson, Nevada with producer Kane Churko.

Overview 
Designed to appeal to American audiences, Underworld marks the first time Vamps brought in a producer and co-writers on songs. The concept bringing the album to life was the "'Underworld' is not a place that we can see with our eyes, 'the physical world,' but the dark side that's hidden beneath the surface, 'the shadow world' where VAMPS' true nature lies." "Vamps has always been trying to portray a world that exists between something that 'could be of this world, but isn't' and that 'might not exist, but does.'"

The track list consists of 11 songs including "Rise or Die" recorded as a coupling song to "Inside of Me" featuring Chris Motionless from Motionless in White."Sin in Justice", done in collaboration with Apocalyptica also included

Track listing

References 

2010 albums
Vamps (band) albums